A telluroxide is a type of organotellurium compound with the formula R2TeO.  These compounds are analogous to sulfoxides in some respects.  Reflecting the decreased tendency of Te to form multiple bonds, telluroxides exist both the monomer and the polymer, which are favored in solution and the solid state, respectively:
(R2TeO)n    n R2TeO
Telluroxides are prepared from the telluroethers by halogenation followed by base hydrolysis:
R2Te  +  Br2   →   R2TeBr2
R2TeBr2  +  2 NaOH   →   R2TeO  +  2 NaBr  +  H2O

References

Organotellurium compounds
Functional groups